muvee Technologies is the Singapore-based inventor of the world's first automatic video editing software for Windows. In 2001, muvee launched the award-winning autoProducer  for PCs and in 2005 became the first to offer mobile video editing software on the Symbian 3 platform for the world's first videocamera phone, the Nokia 7610.  In 2006 it announced another world's first with the Nikon Coolpix S5, where it embedded its automatic slideshow creation engine into the S-series point-and-shoot digital camera. In 2014, muvee launched Action Studio, the world’s first mobile video editing app for action cam users and followed up with ReAction, an app which specifically creates dramatic slomo video sequences for both iOS and Android.

muvee's technologies have shipped on over 750 million devices. Strategic partnerships with leading brands in PCs, mobile, and imaging devices include Samsung, LG, HTC, Sony, Alcatel, Nikon, Nokia, HP, Dell and Olympus.

muvee’s automatic video editing solutions are delivered to handset OEMs, social networks and partners as an SDK or complete applications and various apps are available in Android and iOS app stores globally.

muvee also developed the Action Cam App for Sony's Action Cam series, available on both the iOS AppStore and Google Play

Products
muvee Reveal 
muvee Reveal Business 
Action Studio (iOS and Android) 
ReAction Slomo Video Creator (iOS and Android)
muvee 360 Video Stitcher for Samsung Gear 360 (Mac)
Turbo Video Stabilizer
Turbo Video Cutter

Technology
The Artistic Intelligence™ engine built in to muvee automatically creates movies that are called "muvees". Using advanced signal processing techniques, input video and photos are analyzed automatically for scene boundaries, human faces and other proprietary metrics. Chosen music tracks are analyzed for the beats of the music, and the Emotional Index™ of the song. Users can choose one of several editing Styles and a muvee is automatically generated along with effects and transitions all synched to the beat and emotional contours of the music. Editing Style templates are authored by actual professional film producers and a rich library is currently available. Each Style contains a mix of effects and transitions that are applied to video and photos in synchronization with the music.

muvee announced CODEN in 2010 to enable fast trimming of HD videos in under-powered phones. Previously, it was deemed impossible to edit video in low-mid range feature phones. In higher end Smartphones, although there is more memory and processor power, video is captured in up to 4K, hence the pixels involved are growing exponentially faster than the CPU power.

BUT consumers want to do MORE with the video that they have captured on the phone. Taking ideas from minimally invasive heart surgery, MUVEE engineers created new methods to surgically manipulate video files WITHOUT having to decompress them.

CODEN Compressed Domain Editing Ngine
Basic editing: TRIM/JOIN/REPLACE AUDIO features
Low heap memory requirements
Low CPU requirements
MTK friendly

This patented technology is now available to Device Makers as an Application Development Kit (ANSI C) along with the corresponding Video Renderers, Codecs and GUI abstraction layers for application development in device maker’s proprietary environments and chipsets.

In 2014 muvee released their Android mAMS (muvee Advanced Multimedia SDK) targeted at software developers and mobile handset makers to quickly create multimedia applications for Android.  It contains modules to support all the basic video, image and audio manipulation operations typically needed in any multimedia application, including trim, split, joining of video clips, balancing audio and music, sound effects, fast transcoding, adding overlays with transparencies, generating thumbnails etc.

Company history
muvee Technologies was founded by Terence Swee, a Singaporean electronic engineer and Dr. Pete Kellock, a Scotsman with a doctorate in electronic music. The founders began working together in 1999 at Kent Ridge Digital Labs (KRDL), a technology business incubator sponsored by the Government of Singapore.

See also
Video editing software
Comparison of video editing software
List of video editing software

References

External links
muvee Technologies
 muvee Reveal X

Internet in Singapore